This is a list of events held and scheduled by the Professional Fighters League, a mixed martial arts organization based in the United States. This list also includes events by the league's predecessor, the World Series of Fighting (WSOF).

Scheduled events

Past events

WSOF events

Number of events by year

WSOF
2012 – 1
2013 – 8
2014 – 11
2015 – 11
2016 – 10
2017 – 4

PFL
2018 – 11
2019 – 10
2021 – 10
2022 – 10

Event locations
The following locations have hosted a combined 86 WSOF and PFL events as of 2022.

 United States (73)

 Canada (6)

 Nicaragua (2)

 China (1)

 England (1)

 Japan (1)

 Philippines (1)

 Wales''' (1)

References

Professional Fighters League
Professional Fighters League